Sir Weldon Dalrymple-Champneys, 2nd Baronet  (7 May 1892 – 14 December 1980) was a British physician who was a leading figure in the public health service.

Career
Weldon Champneys was the only surviving son of Sir Francis Champneys, 1st Baronet (also a physician) and his wife Virginia, daughter of Sir John Dalrymple, 7th Baronet. He was educated at Gresham's School and studied medicine at Oriel College, Oxford, and St Bartholomew's Hospital, London. His studies were interrupted by the First World War when he served in the Grenadier Guards and reached the rank of captain. He finally obtained his first medical degrees (MB BCh) in 1922 and went on to gain a doctorate (MD) from Oxford in 1929. In 1924 he changed his name by deed poll, adding his mother's surname to his father's and becoming Weldon Dalrymple Champneys. He joined the Ministry of Health and rose to be Deputy Chief Medical Officer 1940–56. He was appointed  in the 1957 New Year Honours. He was awarded an honorary fellowship of his alma mater, Oriel College, Oxford, in 1967.

Family
In 1924 Weldon Dalrymple-Champneys married Anne Spencer Pratt. He inherited the baronetcy on his father's death in 1930, becoming Sir Weldon Dalrymple-Champneys, 2nd Baronet. Anthony Blunt  later claimed that Lady Dalrymple-Champneys was a low-level MI5 agent. She died in 1968 and in 1974 he married Norma Russell (née Lewis) who had been librarian of Somerville College, Oxford, 1952–69; she died in 1997. There were no children of either marriage, so the baronetcy became extinct on Sir Weldon's death.

References

Sources
DALRYMPLE-CHAMPNEYS, Captain Sir Weldon, Who Was Who, A & C Black, 1920–2016 (online edition, Oxford University Press, 2014)
Obituary: Sir Weldon Dalrymple-Champneys: Leading figure in the public health service, The Times, London, 16 December 1980, page 15.

External links

Portrait of Captain Sir Weldon Dalrymple-Champneys by Isaac Michael Cohen (1884–1951) at Oriel College, Oxford
Dalrymple-Champneys, Sir Weldon (1892-1980), Wellcome Library Western Manuscripts and Archives
Sir George Godber, "Lives of the fellows: Weldon (Sir) Dalrymple-Champneys", Royal College of Physicians

1892 births
1980 deaths
People educated at Gresham's School
Alumni of Oriel College, Oxford
Alumni of the Medical College of St Bartholomew's Hospital
20th-century English medical doctors
Civil servants in the Ministry of Health (United Kingdom)
Fellows of the Royal College of Physicians
Baronets in the Baronetage of the United Kingdom
Companions of the Order of the Bath
Presidents of the History of Medicine Society